Hexoplon navajasi is a species of beetle in the family Cerambycidae. It was described by Martins in 1959.

References

Hexoplonini
Beetles described in 1959